Washburn Historic District is a national historic district located near Bostic, Rutherford County, North Carolina.  It encompasses 17 contributing buildings and 1 contributing structure in the crossroads community of Washburn.  It developed after 1915, and includes notable examples of Classical Revival style architecture.  The principal historic buildings in the district are the Edgar Nollie Washburn House, two rental dwellings, a barn, the Washburn store, the Washburn Funeral Home, and Washburn-Davis House.

It was added to the National Register of Historic Places in 2002, with a boundary increase in 2006.

References

Historic districts on the National Register of Historic Places in North Carolina
Neoclassical architecture in North Carolina
Buildings and structures in Rutherford County, North Carolina
National Register of Historic Places in Rutherford County, North Carolina